St. Joseph's Catholic Mission Church is a site on the National Register of Historic Places located in Townsend, Montana.  It was added to the Register on November 5, 1998.  Originally a Catholic church, the building is now a museum known as Canton Church Historic Site.

The church was built during 1875-76.  According to its NRHP nomination, it is "the oldest extant example of secular Roman Catholic church architecture in Montana. It is also a rare example of Colonial Style architecture. The addition of a belfry and steeple in 1902 somewhat altered the church's Colonial appearance, but still carried forward its earlier design features."

The church building was moved to its current location in 1954 by the U.S. Bureau of Reclamation in order to save it from demolition.

References

External links

 Canton Church Restoration Foundation
 Information

1876 establishments in Montana Territory
History museums in Montana
Museums in Broadwater County, Montana
Churches on the National Register of Historic Places in Montana
Roman Catholic churches completed in 1876
Former Roman Catholic church buildings in Montana
National Register of Historic Places in Broadwater County, Montana
19th-century Roman Catholic church buildings in the United States
Colonial Revival architecture in Montana
Relocated buildings and structures in Montana